Fujiko is a Japanese feminine given name, usually derived from 藤 (Fuji), which means "Wisteria", and the suffix 子 (-ko), which means "child" or "child of". Notable people with the name include:

, a Japanese model and actress
, Japanese dancer
, the pen name of a duo of Japanese cartoon artists
, Japanese cross-country skier
, Japanese actress and fashion model
, Japanese artist
, Japanese novelist
, Japanese avant-garde artist 
, a Japanese voice actress
, Japanese actress
 Ingrid Fuzjko V. Georgii-Hemming, also known as Fujiko Hemming, a pianist of classical music

Fictional characters 
, a character in Monkey Punch's manga series Lupin III
 Evil Rose (Fujiko Hinomoto), a character in the Rumble Roses female wrestling games

References 

Japanese feminine given names